Clinton Gilbert Abbott (1881 – 1946) was an American ornithologist, naturalist, and Director of the San Diego Natural History Museum from 1922 to 1946. Abbott supervised the construction of the Museum's current building in Balboa Park, expanded research field trips and expeditions, and participated in important conservation efforts in southern California and the Baja California region.   He was instrumental in the preservation of the southern California desert area that became Anza-Borrego Desert State Park.

Biography

The son of American citizens, Clinton Gilbert Abbott was born in Liverpool, England, on April 17, 1881 to Grace Van Dusen and Lewis Lowe Abbott. Abbott's older brother was the writer and freethinker Leonard Dalton Abbott. Abbott received an A.B. degree from Columbia University in 1903 and pursued graduate studies at Cornell University.  He married Dorothy Clarke in 1915.  From 1910 to 1914, Abbott was vice-president of the Linnaean Society of New York, and from 1918 to 1921 worked as secretary and editor for the New York State Conservation Commission.

In 1921, Abbott took charge of public education programs at the San Diego Natural History Museum, becoming director of the museum in 1922.  He served as the President of the San Diego Natural History Society from 1923 to 1925.  Abbott was director of the museum from 1922 to 1946.

Under Abbott's leadership, the museum expanded its research and conservation work, education, and public programming, and in 1932, the museum moved into its current building, designed by noted San Diego architect William Templeton Johnson. In 1927, Abbott proposed the creation of a conservation area in the Borrego Palm Canyon and Thousand Palms Canyon areas east of San Diego; in 1933, Borego  Palms Desert State Park was created, a 185,000-acre beginning for what would become the 600,000 acre Anza-Borrego Desert State Park.

 
Abbott was a member of the American Ornithologists Union, the Western Society of Naturalists, the Cooper Ornithological Society, the National Audubon Society, the International Committee for Wildlife Protection, the American Society of Mammalogists, and many other professional societies.

Abbott died in San Diego, California, on March 5, 1946.

Legacy
Abbott is commemorated in the scientific name of a subspecies of gecko, Coleonyx variegatus abbotti.

Publications available online
Abbott, Clinton Gilbert. 'The Home-Life of the Osprey'. London, Witherby & co., 1911. https://archive.org/details/homelifeofosprey00abbo.
Abbott, Clinton G. 'Friends and Foes of Wild Life. A Discussion of Certain Predacious Birds and Animals from the Standpoint of the Sportsman, Trapper and Farmer'. Albany: J.B. Lyon company, printers, 1919. https://www.biodiversitylibrary.org/bibliography/36674.

Selected bibliography

References

External links
 
 The San Diego Natural History Museum Research Library houses a significant collection of Clinton Abbott's papers and photographs.

1881 births
1946 deaths
People from San Diego
Scientists from California
American ornithologists
Directors of museums in the United States
People associated with the San Diego Natural History Museum
20th-century American zoologists
Cornell University alumni
Columbia College (New York) alumni
American expatriates in the United Kingdom